Halodule is a genus of plants in the family Cymodoceaceae described as a genus in 1841.  It is  widespread on tropical and semi-tropical ocean shores of all continents except Europe and Antarctica.

Species
Hybridization has been reported in the Pacific between H. pinifolia and H. uninervis.

There are six recognised species:
Halodule bermudensis - Bermuda
Halodule ciliata - Panama
Halodule emarginata - SE Brazil
Halodule pinifolia - India, Sri Lanka, Southeast Asia, Hainan, Taiwan, Ryukyu Islands, New Guinea, Queensland, Fiji, New Caledonia, Tonga, Caroline Islands
Halodule uninervis - shores of Indian + Pacific Oceans, Red Sea, Persian Gulf, Bay of Bengal, Papuasia, Queensland, Micronesia
Halodule wrightii - Atlantic Ocean shores including Caribbean + Gulf of Mexico: Africa (Senegal, Mauritania, Angola), West Indies, South America (Venezuela, Brazil), Mexico, Central America, United States (TX LA MS AL FL NC MD)

References

External links
Jepson Manual Treatment

Cymodoceaceae
Alismatales genera